"Out of My League" is a song recorded by American band Fitz and the Tantrums and produced by Tony Hoffer. The song is the lead single from the band's second studio album, More Than Just a Dream. "Out of My League" was released as a single on February 7, 2013. The song became the group's first number one hit on the Alternative Songs chart, as well as making history for completing the slowest climb to the summit of the chart, at 33 weeks.

Other versions
A French version of the song, entitled "Out of My League (version française)", has also been released, and is being played on Canadian radio. This version has most of the verses sung in French, while the chorus remains in English.

On July 30, 2013, Fitz and the Tantrums released four remixes of the single by Josh One, Peking Duk, Story of the Running Wolf, and TEPR.

In October 2013, DJ Earworm, Capital Cities, and Fitz and the Tantrums released a mash-up called "Kangaroo League", combining "Out of My League" with two songs by Capital Cities ("Kangaroo Court" and "Safe and Sound"), to promote the Capital Cities and Fitz and the Tantrums "Bright Futures" tour.

Music video
The music video for "Out of My League," which was directed by Jordan Bahat and choreographed by Candice Love, was released on April 22, 2013, via VH1.com and MTV.com. The video utilizes Kinect camera mapping to produce kaleidoscopic, wire-framed, and duplicated visual effects.

Track listing

Chart performance

Weekly charts

Year-end charts

Certifications

References

2013 singles
Fitz and The Tantrums songs
Elektra Records singles
2013 songs
Song recordings produced by Tony Hoffer